Frits van Oostrom (born 15 May 1953 in Utrecht, Netherlands) is University Professor for the Humanities at Utrecht University. In 1999 he was a visiting Professor at Harvard for the Erasmus Chair. From September 2004 to June 2005, he was a fellow of the Netherlands Institute for Advanced Study (NIAS). He was awarded the Spinozapremie in 1995. In May 2005 he became president of the Royal Netherlands Academy of Arts and Sciences (KNAW) for a three-year period. He had been member of the same institution since 1994.

In the later years Van Oostrom was given the task to assemble a Dutch Canon, meaning: what everyone should know of the Netherlands and its history.

References

External links
 
 Press release on Oostrom's election as President of KNAW

1953 births
Living people
Academic staff of Utrecht University
Academic staff of Leiden University
Members of the Royal Netherlands Academy of Arts and Sciences
Dutch medievalists
Spinoza Prize winners